The 1953 Colombo Cup was the second edition of the Colombo Cup held in Rangoon, Burma. India won the cup for a second time by winning all thee matches. It was India's first outright win in an international football tournament played abroad. The team received the rolling Colombo Cup and a Special Burma Cup for permanent retention.

Overview 
The India team arrived in Rangoon on 22 October 1953 and the Pakistan side, a week before. The Indian Express described the Aung San Stadium, where all matches were to be played, as having "concrete and semi permanent stands all around the ground" with a capacity of 30,000. The rules of the tournament had not made wearing boots mandatory. Four of India's players — Sailen Manna, Ahmed Khan, Pansanttom Venkatesh and M. Thangaraj (in the second half) — played bare-footed against Pakistan in the tournament's first game, on 23 October.

Squads

Points table

(C) refers to champions

Matches

Reference

Colombo Cup
1953 in Ceylon
1953 in Asian football